Kuželj may refer to:

 Kuželj, Kostel, a village in the Municipality of Kostel, Slovenia
 Kuželj, Croatia, a village in the municipality of Delnice